Football Club Perun is a Bulgarian association football club based in Kresna, currently playing in the South-West Third League, the third level of Bulgarian football.

Current squad 
As of 1 September 2019

League positions

References

External links 
 Club profile at bgclubs.eu

Perun